Rohinton P. Medhora is a Canadian economist. His fields of expertise are monetary and trade policy, international economic relations, and development economics. He is a Centre for International Governance Innovation (CIGI) distinguished fellow and former president of CIGI.

Education  
Medhora  earned his B.A. and M.A. at the University of Toronto, where he majored in economics, followed by a doctorate in economics in 1988 from the same university. His doctoral thesis is titled Assessing the costs and benefits of membership in the West African Monetary Union, 1976-84.   He subsequently taught at Toronto for a number of years.

Career 
Medhora was the president of CIGI from May 2012 to August 2022. He also served on CIGI's former International Board of Governors from 2009 to 2014. Previously, he was vice president of programs at Canada’s International Development Research Centre (IDRC). Medhora is chair of the Board for the Institute for New Economic Thinking, and a member of the Board for the McLuhan Foundation and the Partnership for African Social and Governance Research. He is a member of the Advisory Board for the WTO Chairs Programme. Medhora also sits on The Lancet and the Financial Times Commission on Governing Health Futures 2030, and is named as a member of the Commission on Global Economic Transformation, co-chaired by Nobel economics laureates Michael Spence and Joseph Stiglitz. In August 2021, he was named Chair of the Ontario Workplace Recovery Advisory Committee.

He has produced several books: Finance and Competitiveness in Developing Countries (2001, Routledge) and Financial Reform in Developing Countries (1998, Macmillan), which he co-edited with José Fanelli. In 2013, he was co-editor of Canada-Africa Relations: Looking Back, Looking Ahead (2013, McGill Queens university Press), which is volume 27 in the Canada Among Nations book series. In 2014, he co-edited International Development: Ideas, Experience, and Prospects (2014, Oxford University Press) and Crisis and Reform: Canada and the International Financial System (2014, McGill-Queen's University Press), which is volume 28 in the Canada Among Nations book series.

Development economics 
Early in his career, Medhora’s work focused on development economics. During his time at IDRC, Medhora focused particularly on development finance. He argued that policy makers should avoid “cookie cutter” approaches to economic policy in developing economies. In other words, what works for one country – be it developed or otherwise – may not work in other contexts.  His major publications in this area are:
 [With R. Blundell and C. Heady], "Labour Markets in an Era of Adjustment: the Case of Côte d'Ivoire", in S. Horton, R. Kanbur, and D. Mazumdar, eds., Labour Markets in an Era of Adjustment, Washington D.C.: The World Bank, 1994.
 "The Allocation of Seigniorage in the Franc Zone: the BEAC and BCEAO Regions Compared", World Development, October 1995.
 "Seigniorage Flows in the West African Monetary Union, 1976-89", Weltwirtschaftliches Archiv, September 1992.
[With José María Fanelli] "Financial Reform in Developing Countries." Palgrave MacMillan, 1998. 
“The Uneven Build Up of Global Reserves: Ways Forward”, World Economics, October–December 2007.
[With José María Fanelli] "Finance and Competitiveness in Developing Countries." Routledge, International Development Research Centre, 2001. 
 [With David M. Malone], “Development: Advancement Through International Organizations”, CIGI Paper No. 31, May 2014.
[With Bruce Currie-Alder, Ravi Kanbur and David M. Malone] "International Development: Ideas, Experience, and Prospects". Oxford University Press, 2014. 
[With Yiagdeesen Samy] "Canada-Africa Relations: Looking Back, Looking Ahead". McGill-Queens University Press, 2016. 
 [With Dane Rowlands] "Crisis and Reform: Canada and the International Financial System". McGill-Queens University Press, 2016. 
"Policy choices in the 21st century – where to start?", Middle East Development Journal. Vo 11, No 2, 277-288, September 2019.
“Forward: Research Addressing COVID-19 in Africa: Challenges and Leadership in a Context of Global Economic Transformation.” Institute for New Economic Thinking (INET), 2022

Multilateralism 
Medhora argues that strong multilateral institutions are important for effective global governance. He points to institutions like the G20, the IMF and the WTO as examples of institutions that have the potential to make positive contributions to global well being. He also identifies trade negotiations as a potential forum for multilateral global governance, and argues that trade agreements have the potential to be mechanisms for addressing diverse challenges. In this field, his publications include:

 "International Cooperation: Is the Multilateral System Helping?" CIGI Paper No. 218, June 2019.
 "The G20's "Development" Agenda: Fundamental, Not a Sidebar," CIGI Policy Brief No. 80, June 2016.
 "Refreshing Global Trade Governance," Council on Foreign Relations, January 2017.
 "Smaller Developing Countries and the G20: Ensuring their Voices Are Heard," Centre for International Governance Innovation, May 2010.
"Will the Price Ever be Right? Carbon Pricing and the WTO", Trade, Law and Development. Maria Panezi. Vol 10, No 1, 2018.
"Bypasses to the International Monetary Fund". Transnational Legal Theory. Vo 10, No 3-4, September 2019.
[With Taylor Owen] "A Post-Covid-19 Digital Bretton Woods", Project Syndicate, April 17, 2020.

Innovation policy 
Medhora has argued that, in an economy increasingly driven by intangible assets, public policy should be oriented towards promoting the production of intellectual property. Along with promoting innovation, he argues that international governance frameworks are needed in order to ensure artificial intelligence and big data are deployed ethically. To address the challenges and opportunities of the new economy, Medhora has call for a “Bretton Woods moment” in which international consensus is formed around the principle that the technology-fuelled economy should serve the global good. His major publications in this area are :
 "Rethinking Policy in a Digital World," CIGI Policy Brief No. 143, November 2015.
 "Data Governance in the Digital Age," CIGI Special Report, May 2018.
 "New Thinking on Innovation," CIGI Special Report, November 2017.
 "AI & Global Governance: Three Paths Towards a Global Governance of Artificial Intelligence," United Nations University Centre for Policy Research, October 2018.
 "The definition of work is about to be permanently transformed," The Globe and Mail, July 2018.

References

Living people
Canadian economists
University of Toronto alumni
Academic staff of the University of Toronto
Canadian people of Parsi descent
Year of birth missing (living people)
Place of birth missing (living people)